Petro Ivanovych Denysenko (13 September 1920 – 9 September 1998) was a Soviet and Ukrainian athlete. He competed in the men's pole vault at the 1952 Summer Olympics, representing the Soviet Union.

References

External links
 

1920 births
1998 deaths
Sportspeople from Chernihiv Oblast
Athletes (track and field) at the 1952 Summer Olympics
Olympic athletes of the Soviet Union
Soviet Athletics Championships winners
Soviet male hurdlers
Soviet male pole vaulters
Ukrainian male hurdlers
Ukrainian male pole vaulters